The Mysterious Rider is a lost 1927 American silent Western film directed by John Waters and written by Paul Gangelin, Zane Grey, Alfred Hustwick, and Fred Myton. The film stars Jack Holt, Betty Jewel, Charles Sellon, David Torrence, Tom Kennedy, Guy Oliver, and Al Hart. The film was released on March 5, 1927, by Paramount Pictures.

Plot
Based on the Zane Grey novel of the same name, The Mysterious Rider centers around Bent Wade (Jack Holt), a mysterious masked rider who fights to save the homesteads of a colony of desert ranchers from illegal seizure. He eventually falls in love with Dorothy King (Betty Jewel), the daughter of a local financier, after saving her from quicksand.

Cast 
 Jack Holt as Bent Wade
 Betty Jewel as Dorothy King
 Charles Sellon as Cliff Harkness
 David Torrence as Mark King
 Tom Kennedy as Lem Spooner
 Guy Oliver as Jack Wilson
 Al Hart as Sheriff
 Ivan Christy as Tom Saunders
 Arthur Hoyt as King's Secretary

References

External links 
 
 

1927 films
1927 Western (genre) films
Paramount Pictures films
Films directed by John Waters (director born 1893)
Films based on works by Zane Grey
American black-and-white films
Lost Western (genre) films
Lost American films
1927 lost films
Silent American Western (genre) films
1920s English-language films
1920s American films